Delicado (Spanish and Portuguese "delicate") may refer to
 "Delicado" (song), from 1952 with music by Valdir Azevedo and lyrics by Jack Lawrence
 Assunto Delicado, an EP of the Brazilian singer Joelma (2016)
 Francisco Delicado, a Renaissance writer
José Delicado Baeza, a Roman Catholic archbishop